The Ministry of Water Resources is a department of the Syrian government. The current minister is Tammam Raad.

History
The Ministry of Irrigation was created by Law No. 16 of 1982 as a process of compiling the tasks that were distributed to a number of public agencies (the Ministry of Public Works and Water Resources - the Ministry of the Euphrates Dam) and then attached to them the quality institutions in the Euphrates basin that were created after the completion of the dam, which is the Public Institution for Land Reclamation and The General Authority for Investment and Development of the Euphrates Basin, as attached to it by the General Corporation for the Euphrates Dam, the General Company for Water Projects and the General Company for Water Studies were attached to the ministry, and in 2005, with the aim of developing the planning process for the water sector in Syria, it created the “General Authority for Water Resources to replace the general irrigation directorates.” 

In 2012, the Ministry of Water Resources was created to replace the Ministry of Irrigation, and drinking water institutions and sewage companies in the governorates were linked to it.

Directorates and bodies 
 Directorate of Systems and Technology
 Directorate of Human Resources
 Directorate of Irrigation and Drainage
 Directorate of Planning and International Cooperation
 Directorate of Legal Affairs
 Drinking Water Directorate
 Administrative Development Directorate
 Directorate of Equipment and Energy Rationalization
 Sanitation Directorate
 Directorate of International Waters and Dams

List of Ministers

See also
Water supply and sanitation in Syria
Water resources management in Syria
Water management in Greater Damascus

References 

Government ministries of Syria
Ministries established in 2012
Irrigation ministries
Water
Organizations based in Damascus
Politics of Syria
All stub articles
2012 establishments in Syria